Canterbury is the third studio album by British heavy metal band Diamond Head. It was recorded and released in 1983, reaching number 32 on the UK Albums Chart.

Background
This album was originally entitled Making Music (after the first track on the album) but later became Canterbury. The success of this album was initially stalled by the fact that the first 20,000 copies suffered vinyl-pressing problems, causing the LP to jump. In addition, this album was an attempt by the band to show that they could write more than just heavy metal songs. However, many fans wanted a heavier follow up to the previous record, Borrowed Time and did not like the progressive direction.

There were two singles to be released from this album, which were "Makin' Music" (that had an extended version and an interview with Andy Peebles, now available on the released version of the album) and "Out of Phase", which had "The Kingmaker" as its B-side. "Out of Phase" was also released as a B-side for a live version of "Sucking My Love".

The song "Knight of the Swords" is about the god Arioch in Michael Moorcock's Elric stories.

This album was only released on CD in Japan making it a highly collectible item. On 15 October 2007 it was released by Metal Mind Productions on CD format, with bonus tracks. However, this was limited to 2000 copies. The album was made widely available in 2009, along with Borrowed Time, as part of the boxset The MCA Years.

Track listing

Personnel

Diamond Head
Sean Harris – vocals
Brian Tatler – guitars
Colin Kimberley, Mervyn Goldsworthy – bass
Duncan Scott, Robbie France – drums

Additional musicians
Jamie Lane – drums
Chris Heaton – keyboards and fairlight
The Jolly Slaves – backing vocals

Production
Mike Shipley – producer, engineer
Bryan 'Chuck' New – assistant engineer

References

Diamond Head (band) albums
MCA Records albums
1983 albums
Albums produced by Mike Shipley